Uyea (pronounced "oe-yë") may refer to:

 Uyea, Unst, an uninhabited island south of Unst in Shetland, Scotland
 Uyea, Northmavine, an uninhabited island northwest of Mainland, Shetland

See also
 Uyeasound, a village on Unst overlooking the first Uyea
 Uynarey, one of the Shetland islands